The Mk 19 grenade launcher (pronounced Mark 19) is an American 40 mm belt-fed automatic grenade launcher that was first developed during the Vietnam War.

Overview

The Mk 19 is a belt-fed, blowback-operated, air-cooled, crew-served, fully-automatic weapon that is designed not to cook off. It fires 40 mm grenades at a cyclic rate of 325 to 375 rounds per minute, giving a practical rate of fire of 60 rounds per minute (rapid) and 40 rounds per minute (sustained). The weapon operates on the blowback principle, which uses the chamber pressure from each fired round to load and re-cock the weapon. The nearest safe distance to launch the grenade is 310 meters in training and 75 meters in combat. Though the Mk 19 has a flash suppressor, it serves only to save the eyesight of its operator, not concealing the weapon's position. For night operation, a picatinny rail quadrant sight can be added for thermal and night vision optics.

The Mk 19A is a man-portable crew-served weapon that can fire from a tripod-mounted position or from a vehicle mount, with the latter being the preferred method, as the weapon alone weighs . The primary ammunition for it is the high-explosive dual-purpose M430 grenade. It can also punch through  of rolled homogeneous armor with a direct hit (0-degree obliquity), which means it can penetrate most infantry fighting vehicles and armored personnel carriers. It is especially effective when used against enemy infantry formations. The ammunition comes in cans that hold a 32- or 48-grenade belt weighing , respectively. Due to its low recoil and comparatively light weight, it has been adapted for use on many different platforms, including small attack boats, fast attack vehicles such as the Humvee (HMMWV), AAV and Stryker, military jeeps, and a large variety of naval mounts.

The Mk 19 automatic grenade launcher replaced the earlier Mk 18 hand-cranked multiple grenade launcher. The 40 mm ammunition used (40×53 mm) is not interchangeable with that used in the M203 (40×46 mm). The M203 ammunition develops a lower chamber pressure, and resultant lower muzzle velocity and range, compared to ammunition loaded for the Mk 19. The Mk 19 fires from an open bolt. The rounds are mechanically fed onto the bolt face with the pull of the charging handles. When the trigger is pressed, the bolt closes, and the firing pin is released. The recoil blows back the bolt, feeds a new round onto the bolt face, which pushes the expended casing off the bolt face.

Production of the Mk 19 is managed by Saco Defense Industries (now a division of General Dynamics Ordnance and Tactical Systems).

In November 2014, General Dynamics entered into an agreement with Advanced Material Engineering Pte Ltd, a subsidiary of Singapore Technologies Kinetics, to manufacture 40 mm high-velocity airburst ammunition for the U.S. military. The 40 mm airburst grenade uses a programmable, time-based fuse that computes and programs the detonation time into it, which counts down once fired to zero to detonate at the intended target point.  The airburst ammunition is compatible with the Mk 19, which would give it greater effectiveness and lethality, particularly against concealed and defilade targets.

The U.S. Army plans to introduce several new features to the Mk 19 in an upgrade package that could be introduced by late 2017. Initiatives include: increased muzzle velocity through a less resistant barrel; increased cyclic rate from an improved profile for the vertical cam to reduce the force needed to charge the weapon; enhancing reliability with a redesigned round-positioning block to decrease the chance of misfires; increased durability and shortened re-assembly time after maintenance from a new cocking cam and lever; and an updated mechanical sight utilizing up-to-date ammunition ballistic data to aid accuracy.

The Mk 19 is used as part of the Şahin counter unmanned air system (C-UAS) developed by Aselsan, which entered service with the Turkish Armed Forces in July 2022 and uses Atom 40 mm ammunition to detect and destroy mini and micro UAVs out to 700 meters.

Users
GDOTS has built nearly 35,000 Mk 19 Mod 3 systems for roughly 30 customers since 1984. Users of the Mk 19 include:

 : Unknown numbers were given to the Afghan army at an unknown period of time, captured and in use by the Taliban.

 : Argentine Marines.
 
 : Used by the Brazilian Marine Corps.
 : Used by the Chilean Army and the Chilean Marine Corps.
 : Manufactured locally by Helwan.
 
 
 : Used by Iraqi special forces on Humvees.
 : Adopted by the Israeli Defence Forces (under the name "Maklar", for mikla rimonim or "grenade machinegun"), to be fielded in infantry and mechanized units. The Mk 19 was formerly manufactured locally.
 : Kosovo Security Forces.
 
 
 :
: Moroccan Army.
 
 : Used by the Portuguese Army.
 
 
 : Designated Grsp 92. Used by Kustjägarna and Amfibiebataljonen and also by the 31st Airborne Battalion
 
 : Produced under licence by MKEK. Used by Turkish Land Forces.
 
 : Currently in widespread use throughout the U.S. Armed Forces.

See also
 AGS-17
 AGS-30
 AGS-40
 UAG-40
 List of grenade launchers
 Mk 47 Mod 0 Striker, U.S. military successor in limited service
 U.S. Navy equipment designations
 XM174 grenade launcher, predecessor used by the U.S. military during the Vietnam War

References

External links

 MK 19, 40-mm GRENADE MACHINE GUN, MOD 3 - Department of the Army, 2003
 General Dynamics
 MK19 MOD 3 40mm Machine Gun - Global Security
 40mm grenades - Global Security
 M430 40mm Cartridge High-explosive dual purpose (HEDP) round specs

Automatic grenade launchers
40×53mm grenade launchers
Grenade launchers of the United States
40 mm artillery
United States Marine Corps equipment
API blowback firearms
Military equipment introduced in the 1960s